Rachid Turki (1918–2003) was a Tunisian football manager. He was the first manager of the Tunisia national football team. He also coached CA Bizerte.

References

1918 births
Tunisian footballers
Tunisian football managers
Club Athlétique Bizertin managers
Tunisia national football team managers
2003 deaths
Association footballers not categorized by position